{{Infobox person
|name=Darren Dreger
| image                    =
| image_size                = 225px
| alt                       = 
| caption                   = 
|birth_date=
|birth_place=Red Deer, Alberta
|known_for=Sportscaster on The NHL on TSN'
|occupation=Sportscaster, and analyst
| employer = Bell Media
|alma_mater=Western Academy Broadcasting College
| spouse(s) = Holly
| children = 2
}}
Darren Dreger (born June 13, 1968) is a Canadian sportscaster for TSN, and currently serves as one of TSN's Hockey Insiders. He had previously hosted Leafs Lunch on CFMJ AM640 Toronto Radio.

Broadcasting career
After graduating from the Western Academy Broadcasting College, Dreger was immediately offered a job from a radio station in Winkler, Manitoba. However, on the same day, he was offered another job closer to home, which he accepted. Beginning in 1992, Dreger lent his voice as a play-by-play announcer for the Brandon Wheat Kings. This lasted until 1993 when he was hired to replace Daren Millard at CTV Winnipeg.  While there, he also conducted play-by-play for the Manitoba Moose of the American Hockey League. 

From Winnipeg, Dreger moved to Edmonton in 1997 to report on Edmonton Oilers games and was subsequently hired by Sportsnet as a national host for their NHL package in 1998. Dreger was the former host of Hockey Central'' on Rogers Sportsnet between 1998 and 2006. On July 14, 2006, it was announced that Dreger would leave Sportsnet and join TSN on July 31, 2006, hence 'crossing the parking lot'.

Dreger won a Gemini Award in 2010 in the Best Sports Reporting category for his coverage of the firing of NHLPA Executive Director Paul Kelly. He was the only reporter in Chicago when the news broke and therefore had sole coverage. In October 2014, Bob McKenzie and Dreger began appearing as a full-time contributors on NBCSN, until NBC Sports lost the NHL hockey rights to both ESPN and Turner Sports in 2021. This was due to the fact that TSN lost their NHL broadcasting rights package to Sportsnet.

Personal life

Dreger was born in Red Deer, Alberta and grew up in Saskatchewan. Dreger and his wife Holly have two children together, a son, and a daughter.

References

External links
 TSN profile
 TSN adds Darren Dreger to hockey team
 Wheat City Journal article on Darren Dreger
 

1968 births
Living people
Canadian television sportscasters
National Hockey League broadcasters
People from Red Deer, Alberta
Canadian radio sportscasters